Roberto Carlos Holsen Alvarado (born 10 August 1976) is a retired Peruvian footballer who last played for Juan Aurich.

Club career
Holsen has played for a number of clubs in Peru, including Alianza Lima, Sporting Cristal and Cienciano.

International career
Holsen made 22 appearances for the senior Peru national football team from 1999 to 2003.

References

External links

1976 births
Living people
Sportspeople from Callao
Association football forwards
Peruvian footballers
Peru international footballers
Peruvian people of Danish descent
1999 Copa América players
2000 CONCACAF Gold Cup players
Peruvian Primera División players
Club Alianza Lima footballers
C.D. Bella Esperanza footballers
Deportivo Municipal footballers
Sporting Cristal footballers
Cienciano footballers
Alianza Atlético footballers
Al-Shabab FC (Riyadh) players
Club Universitario de Deportes footballers
Club Deportivo Universidad César Vallejo footballers
Sport Áncash footballers
Total Chalaco footballers
Juan Aurich footballers
Peruvian expatriate footballers
Expatriate footballers in Saudi Arabia
Saudi Professional League players